White Mischief may refer to:
 White Mischief (novel), a 1982 novel by James Fox that dramatizes the events around the 1941 murder in Kenya of Josslyn Hay, 22nd Earl of Erroll
 White Mischief (film), a 1987 film based on Fox's book
 White Mischief of Botswana, the 1996 murder of Maria Magdalene "Ria" Wolmarans by Mariette Bosch
 White Mischief (liquor), a brand of Indian vodka and brandy launched in 1996
 White Mischief (festival), a steampunk-themed indoor festival, first organized in London in 2007